International Route 203-CH is a branch line road going eastward from Lanco at Chile Highway 5 to Huahum Pass at the border to Argentina. Some settlements along the road includes: Lanco, Malalhue, Panguipulli and Neltume. The road is paved from Lanco to the north side of Panguipulli Lake where it becomes a gravel road. 

Roads in Chile
Transport in Los Ríos Region